The Lambert automobile and Lambert truck were vehicles built from 1905 through 1916 by the Lambert Automobile Company in Anderson, Indiana, United States. The Lambert automobile was an outgrowth from the Union automobile made by the Union Automobile Company, a previous vehicle that was being manufactured by John William Lambert. The factory manufactured about 3,000 automobiles and trucks per year by 1915 and had several models ranging in price from $1,200 to $3,000 at the time. The vehicles came with a gearless friction drive transmission. The demise of the manufacture of automobiles and trucks came about because of World War I.

Background history
The Lambert automobile is a 1905 outgrowth from the Union automobile that was being constructed by the Union Automobile Company in Union City, Indiana. The Union automobile changed its name to the Lambert automobile and all production was moved to Anderson, Indiana. The new automobile models were then manufactured by the Lambert Automobile Company, which was a subsidiary of the Buckeye Manufacturing Company. The first Lambert car from the automobile plant was sold on June 1, 1905. By 1906 the new automobile had a wide range of models and the company was one of the most successful car manufacturers in the United States at the time. Production reached 3,000 automobiles per year by 1915; trucks and tractors were also made.

The Lambert automobile was the main product of the Lambert Automobile Company from 1905 through 1916, although in the 11 years of production the company also produced trucks, fire engines, and agricultural tractors. The company made its own body parts and designed its car motors. The upholstery used in the manufacture of the automobile was of the best quality available and the finish of the body had 15 layers of paint. When the United States entered into World War I in 1917 the Lambert automobile manufacturing plant was converted into national defense and manufactured war products. The Lambert automobile ended production of the car when the war ended.

Chassis and suspension
All Lambert chassis integrated a high end three-point suspension to save driving power. It decreased the lift required of the automobile body because variations in the road surface. It saved wearing away of the automobile body parts. Most other automobiles of the time used ordinary shock absorbers. On some models a shaft drive was provided, however most Lambert automobile models were built with a chain drive directly to the rear axle.

Powertrain

The Lambert automobile chassis with the gearless friction drive speed change transmission was the basis for all the Lambert vehicles built from 1906 to 1917 including their trucks. The friction system was used for the transmission of motor power to the axle to drive the wheels that propelled the automobile. The flywheel of the motor had a disc that had metals characterized for their special friction qualities. A friction wheel is applied direct to the face of this motor flywheel disc plate by a foot control.

The friction wheel was moved in either direction on the shaft across the face of the motor flywheel friction plate by means of a controller lever. When the friction wheel was in contact with the extreme outer circumference of the motor flywheel friction disc the vehicle was at its highest speed. When the friction wheel was moved towards the center of the car motor flywheel disc the speed would decrease and come to a complete standstill in the center. If carried beyond the center of the flywheel the direction of its rotation would be opposite and the vehicle would be in reverse. This method of transmission of motor power to the driving axle that propelled the vehicle was smooth. This was in contrast to the ordinary toothed gear transmission of other cars that then had a "start with a jerk" motion that was noticeable.

Motor 
The Lambert automobile motor in the early part of manufacturing moved around on the chassis. It was on the back of the chassis, then in the center, then to the front, and back again to the rear of the automobile. The early motors were built at the Lambert factories of the Buckeye Manufacturing Company and later they were outsourced to other proprietary manufactures.

The valve action of the motors were hardened steel cams that worked off the cam shaft. The cam faces were convex and worked on hardened rollers. They were carried in swinging forks which bore against square ended sliders. The valves were aluminum heads driven to shoulder on riveted steel stems and were direct with no side action. The compression was 50 to 55 pounds of pressure.

The Lambert opposed cylinder motor had features not common in the gas engine of that time period. For one thing, the oiler was of the type in which a ratchet actuated worm drive drove a spring successively over the oil leads to be supplied. The plunge spring was compressed by a circle of wedges and the rise from each compression being regulated by a screw. Oil leads dropped oil on the crank wrist rod ends appropriately.

Racing success
Lambert participated in an automobile race in 1905 from Chicago to St. Paul and came in second place. There were a total of 53 automobiles entered into the race and Lambert's was the only gasoline powered automobile to finish.

Lambert automobiles
Some of the models of the Lambert automobiles and trucks are described below.

Lambert trucks

Model A

It was a 2-passenger truck. The motor was a pair of opposed cylinders 5.5X6 set in rear of driver's seat of the vehicle. It came with the standard friction disk drive transmission put on all Lambert vehicles. It cost $2000 . A truck platform and a driver's hood was an extra option.

Model B
It cost $1500 . The motor was a pair of opposed cylinders 6X4.5 set in rear of driver's seat of the vehicle. It also came with the standard truck friction disk drive transmission. It was a 2-passenger truck. A truck platform and a driver's hood was an extra option.

See also

 Union automobile
 John William Lambert
 Buckeye gasoline buggy
 Union Automobile Company
 Lambert Automobile Company
 Buckeye Manufacturing Company
 Lambert Gas and Gasoline Engine Company
 Lambert friction gearing disk drive transmission

References

Sources

Further reading

 Bailey, L. Scott, Historic Discovery: 1891 Lambert, New Claim for America's First Car, Antique Automobile magazine, Vol. 24, No. 5, Oct–Nov 1960
 David Burgess Wise, The New Illustrated Encyclopedia of Automobiles 
 Dittlinger, Esther et al., Anderson: A Pictorial History, G. Bradley Publishing, 1990, 
 Forkner, John L., History of Madison County, Indiana, New York and Chicago, The Lewis Publishing Company, 1914
 Georgano, G.N., The Beaulieu Encyclopedia of the Automobile, Taylor & Francis, 2000, 
 Huffman, Wallace Spencer, Indiana's Place in Automobile History in Indiana History Bulletin, vol 44, no. 2, Feb. 1967; Indianapolis, Indiana Historical Bureau
 Huhti, Thomas, The Great Indiana Touring Book: 20 Spectacular Auto Tours, Big Earth Publishing, 2002, 
 James, Wanda, Driving from Japan, McFarland, 2005, 
 Madden, W. C., Haynes-Apperson and America's First Practical Automobile: A History, McFarland, 2003, 
 Scharchburg, Richard P., Carriages Without Horses: J. Frank Duryea and the Birth of the American Automobile Industry, SAE, 1993, 
 Biography of John W. Lambert, written by his son January 25, 1935 - obtained from the Detroit Public Library, National Automotive History Collection
 The Horseless Age: The Automobile Trade Magazine, The Horseless Age Company, 1902

Brass Era vehicles
Cars introduced in 1905
1900s cars
1910s cars

de:Lambert Automobile Company
Defunct motor vehicle manufacturers of the United States
Vehicle manufacturing companies established in 1905
Vehicle manufacturing companies disestablished in 1917
Motor vehicle manufacturers based in Indiana